Mitchell Benson (born May 30, 1967) is a former American football defensive tackle. He played for the Indianapolis Colts from 1989 to 1990 and for the San Diego Chargers in 1991.

References

1967 births
Living people
Players of American football from Fort Worth, Texas
American football defensive tackles
TCU Horned Frogs football players
Indianapolis Colts players
San Diego Chargers players